This is a list players signed to play in the World Series Hockey, which was scheduled to commence play on 17 December 2011 but was later postponed to 29 February 2012.

The players for the eight teams will be finalized 28 November based on the draft system.

The draft consisted of 24 Rounds where a team picked one player in each round. Each Team has a minimum of 22 and a maximum of 25 Players (including the Captain) with a maximum of 6 Non-Indian Players, a minimum of 4 Local Players from their Territory and a minimum of 4 Indian Youth Players.

A second draft was held on 10 February 2012. Among the notable picks, Canadian captain Ken Pereira was chosen by Pune Strykers while Australian Mark Harris and Indian Hamza Mujtaba got selected by Chennai Cheetahs. South African Olympian Clyde Abraham was picked by Mumbai Marines while Gagan Ajit Singh, the ace Indian striker, will make his comeback into hockey with Sher-e-Punjab.

International

Australia 
Brent Livermore
Eli Matheson
Joseph Reardon
Mark Harris
Matthew Hotchkis
Peter Kelly
Troy Sutherland

Argentina 
Juan Martin Lopez
Lucas Vila
Matias Vila
Mario Almada
Pedro Ibarra
Rodrigo Vila

Brazil 
Daniela Barbosa
Pablo Gomes Navarro

Canada 
Adam Froese
Antoni Kindler
Connor Grimes
Iain Smythe
Sukhwinder Singh Gabbar
Ken Pereira
Mark Pearson
Richard Hildred

England 
Andrew Eversden
Chris Seddon
David Seddon
Mathew Phillips

Germany 
Benedikt Sperling

Ireland 
Phelie Maguire

Malaysia 
Jiwa Mohan
Mohammed Bin Mat Radzi

Netherlands 
Andrew Eversden
Jesse Mahieu
Martijn de Jager
Melchior Looijen
Roderik Huber
Steven Faaij

New Zealand 
Casey Henwood
Lloyd Stephenson

Pakistan 
Adnan Maqsood
Fareed Ahmed
Rehan Butt
Shakeel Abbasi
Syed Imran Warsi
Tariq Aziz
Waseem Ahmad
Zeeshan Ashraf

South Africa 
Clive Terwin
Clyde Abrahams
Geowynne Kyle Gamiet
Lungile Tsolekile
Geowynne Kyle Gamiet
Shanyl Balwanth
Tommy Hammond

South Korea 
Sung Min Lee

Spain 
Alfonso Pombo
Andreu Enrich

United States 
Patrick Harris

India 
150 Indian players, including all the top players from the current national team have signed on and received advanced payments to play in World Series Hockey. Every player has signed a 3-year contract. Four of these will be captains in the inaugural edition of the tournament. This includes Adrian D'Souza, Arjun Halappa, Prabhjot Singh and Sardar Singh.

See also

 Premier Hockey League
 Hockey in India
 Indian National Hockey Team (Men)
 Indian National Hockey Team (Women)

References

External links
 Official Website

 
Field hockey players in India
World Series